The trefoil horseshoe bat (Rhinolophus trifoliatus) is a species of bat in the family Rhinolophidae. It is found in Brunei, India, Indonesia, Malaysia, Myanmar, Singapore, and Thailand. In Borneo locally common up to 1,800m, including mangroves.

Description

Ecology and Behaviour
R. trifoliatus is caught in the understory of primary and secondary rainforest. This species is thought to be solitary, with individuals observed roosting underneath exposed leaves. As with the neotropical Ectophylla alba it is thought that their pale fur may be an adaptation to make them camouflaged when roosting, as sunlight filtering through the leaf will make them appear green.

References

External links
Sound recordings of Rhinolophus trifoliatus on BioAcoustica

Rhinolophidae
Bats of Southeast Asia
Bats of Indonesia
Bats of Malaysia
Mammals of Borneo
Mammals of Myanmar
Mammals of China
Mammals of India
Mammals of Thailand
Fauna of Sumatra
Mammals described in 1834
Taxonomy articles created by Polbot
Taxa named by Coenraad Jacob Temminck